Harry Greensmith (26 December 1899 – 28 October 1967) was an  Australian rules footballer who played with North Melbourne in the Victorian Football League (VFL).

Notes

External links 

1899 births
1967 deaths
Australian rules footballers from Victoria (Australia)
North Melbourne Football Club players